Alum Creek is a stream in the U.S. state of South Dakota.

Alum Creek received its name on account of the naturally occurring bitter river water.

See also
List of rivers of South Dakota

References

Rivers of Fall River County, South Dakota
Rivers of South Dakota